Cheol-min, also spelled Chol-min or Chul-min, is a Korean masculine given name. Its meaning differs based on the hanja used to write each syllable of the name. There are 11 hanja with the reading "cheol" and 27 hanja with the reading "min" on the South Korean government's official list of hanja which may be used in given names.

People with this name include:
Kang Cheol-min (1939–2002), South Korean go player
Park Chul-min (born 1967), South Korean actor
Jang Chul-min (born 1972), South Korean football player
Pak Chol-min (judoka) (born 1982), North Korean judo practitioner
Jong Chol-min (born 1988), North Korean football player
Pak Chol-min (footballer) (born 1988), North Korean football player
Rim Chol-min (born 1990), North Korean football player
Baek Chul-min (born 1992), South Korean actor and model 
Kim Cheol-min (born 1992), South Korean speed skater

See also
List of Korean given names

References

Korean masculine given names